Divi's Laboratories Limited is an Indian multinational pharmaceutical company and producer of active pharmaceutical ingredients (APIs) and intermediates, headquartered in Hyderabad. The company manufactures and custom synthesizes generic APIs, intermediates. The company also manufactures and supplies nutraceutical ingredients through its subsidiary, Divi's Nutraceuticals. Divi's Laboratories is India's fourth largest publicly-listed pharmaceutical company by market capitalization.

History 
Divi's Laboratories was established in 1990 as Divi's Research Centre. The company initially started developing commercial processes for the manufacturing of APIs and intermediates. Divi's Research Centre changed its name to Divi's Laboratories Limited in 1994 to signal its intent to enter the API and intermediates manufacturing industry. Following this, the company established its first Manufacturing facility in 1995 at Choutuppal, Telangana. In 2002, the company's second manufacturing facility commenced operations at Chippada near Visakhapatnam.

The company went public with its initial public offering (IPO) on 17 February 2003. In 2010, the company established a research centre in Hyderabad.

Products and services

Active pharmaceutical ingredients (APIs) and intermediates 
Divi's Laboratories has between 60-85% global market share in generic naproxen, dextromethorphan and gabapentin APIs. The company currently has between 20-30% global market share in pregabalin and methylamine APIs. The company's API production is backwards integrated.

Custom synthesis 
Divi's Laboratories custom synthesis division provides contract development and manufacturing (CDMO) services and contract research and manufacturing services (CRAMS). The company's clients include 6 of the top 10 largest multinational pharmaceutical companies.

Nutraceuticals 
Divi’s Nutraceuticals is a subsidiary of Divi's Laboratories, and manufacturers and supplies over 80 forms of carotenoids and vitamins. Divi’s Nutraceuticals was founded in 2006 as a subsidiary of Divi’s Laboratories.

Facilities 
The company has three manufacturing facilities and three R&D centres across India:

Manufacturing 

 Choutuppal Unit - Lingojigudem village, Choutuppal mandal, Yadadri Bhuvanagiri district, Telangana
 DC SEZ Unit - Lingojigudem village, Choutuppal mandal, Yadadri Bhuvanagiri district, Telangana
 Export Oriented Unit - Chippada village, Bheemunipatnam mandal, Visakhapatnam district, Andhra Pradesh
 Divi's Pharma SEZ Unit - Chippada village, Bheemunipatnam mandal, Visakhapatnam district, Andhra Pradesh
 DSN SEZ Unit - Chippada village, Bheemunipatnam mandal, Visakhapatnam district, Andhra Pradesh
 DCV SEZ Unit - Chippada village, Bheemunipatnam mandal, Visakhapatnam district, Andhra Pradesh

References 

Pharmaceutical companies of India
Pharmaceutical companies established in 1990
Indian companies established in 1990
Manufacturing companies based in Hyderabad, India
NIFTY 50
1990 establishments in Andhra Pradesh
Companies listed on the National Stock Exchange of India
Companies listed on the Bombay Stock Exchange